Against All Odds is the third solo studio album by the hip hop artist Tragedy Khadafi. The album was released in 2001 after much delay, and included his 2000 single "Bing Monsters". The album reached #9 in the Billboard Top Heatseekers (Northeast) Album Chart. Tragedy "dissed" his then-former friend Noreaga on the tracks "Crime Nationalist" and "Blood Type", accusing him of stealing his rhyming style and even his hooks. They have since reconciled.

Track listing

Samples
Crime Nationalists
"Niggaz 4 Life" by N.W.A.
Lift Ya Glass
"I Believe to My Soul" by Junior Mance
Permanently Scarred (I Don't Wanna Wait)
"I Dont Want To Wait" by Paula Cole
T.M. (Message to Killa Black)
"Porque Yo Te Amo" by Sandro

References

2001 albums
Tragedy Khadafi albums
Gee Street Records albums
V2 Records albums
Albums produced by Just Blaze
Albums produced by Prince Paul (producer)
Albums produced by Ayatollah